Wilhelm Carl Werner Otto Fritz Franz Wien (13 January 1864 – 30 August 1928) was a German physicist who, in 1893, used theories about heat and electromagnetism to deduce Wien's displacement law, which calculates the emission of a blackbody at any temperature from the emission at any one reference temperature.

He also formulated an expression for the black-body radiation, which is correct in the photon-gas limit. His arguments were based on the notion of adiabatic invariance, and were instrumental for the formulation of quantum mechanics. Wien received the 1911 Nobel Prize for his work on heat radiation.

He was a cousin of Max Wien, inventor of the Wien bridge.

Biography

Early years
Wien was born at Gaffken near Fischhausen, Province of Prussia (now Primorsk, Russia) as the son of landowner Carl Wien. In 1866, his family moved to Drachenstein near Rastenburg (now Kętrzyn, Poland).

In 1879, Wien went to school in Rastenburg and from 1880 to 1882 he attended the city school of Heidelberg. In 1882 he attended the University of Göttingen and the University of Berlin. From 1883 to 1885, he worked in the laboratory of Hermann von Helmholtz and, in 1886, he received his Ph.D. with a thesis on the diffraction of light upon metals and on the influence of various materials upon the color of refracted light. From 1896 to 1899, Wien lectured at RWTH Aachen University. He became twice successor of Wilhelm Conrad Röntgen, in 1900 at the University of Würzburg and in 1919 at the University of Munich. Wien was very active in science politics representing conservative and nationalistic positions though being not as extreme as sharing the attitude of those going to develop the "Deutsche Physik". He appreciated both Albert Einstein and relativity.

Career
In 1896 Wien empirically determined a distribution law of blackbody radiation, later named after him: Wien's law. Max Planck, who was a colleague of Wien's, did not believe in empirical laws, so using electromagnetism and thermodynamics, he proposed a theoretical basis for Wien's law, which became the Wien–Planck law. However, Wien's law was only valid at high frequencies, and underestimated the radiancy at low frequencies. Planck corrected the theory and proposed what is now called Planck's law, which led to the development of quantum theory. However, Wien's other empirical formulation , called Wien's displacement law, is still very useful, as it relates the peak wavelength emitted by a body (λmax), to the temperature of the body (T). In 1900 (following the work of George Frederick Charles Searle), he assumed that the entire mass of matter is of electromagnetic origin and proposed the formula  for the relation between electromagnetic mass and electromagnetic energy.

Wien developed the Wien filter (also known as velocity selector) in 1898 for the study of anode rays. It is a device consisting of perpendicular electric and magnetic fields that can be used as a velocity filter for charged particles, for example in electron microscopes and spectrometers. It is used in accelerator mass spectrometry to select particles based on their speed. The device is composed of orthogonal electric and magnetic fields, such that particles with the correct speed will be unaffected while other particles will be deflected. It can be configured as a charged particle energy analyzer, monochromator, or mass spectrometer.

While studying streams of ionized gas, Wien, in 1898, identified a positive particle equal in mass to the hydrogen atom. Wien, with this work, laid the foundation of mass spectrometry. J. J. Thomson refined Wien's apparatus and conducted further experiments in 1913 then, after work by Ernest Rutherford in 1919, Wien's particle was accepted and named the proton.

In 1911, Wien was awarded the Nobel Prize in Physics "for his discoveries regarding the laws governing the radiation of heat".

See also
History of special relativity
Mass–energy equivalence

Publications

References

External links

 including the Nobel Lecture, 11 December 1911 On the Laws of Thermal Radiation
Wilhelm Wien on www.nobel-winners.com

1864 births
1928 deaths
19th-century  German physicists
20th-century German  physicists
University of Göttingen alumni
Humboldt University of Berlin alumni
Nobel laureates in Physics
German Nobel laureates
People from Kętrzyn
People from the Province of Prussia
Academic staff of RWTH Aachen University
Academic staff of the University of Würzburg
Theoretical physicists